Disambiguation: LNER Thompson Class A2

The London and North Eastern Railway (LNER) Class A2/3 was a class of 4-6-2 steam locomotives. They were newly constructed locomotives, fulfilling the requirement identified by Edward Thompson for a standard express passenger locomotive of the 4-6-2 arrangement with  driving wheels. Fifteen engines were constructed according to this original design, but following the retirement of Thompson as CME, the remaining fifteen locomotives that were planned were immediately redesigned and ultimately emerged as Peppercorn Class A2.

Background
When Edward Thompson was appointed chief mechanical engineer of the London and North Eastern Railway in April 1941, he envisaged a new standardisation programme involving ten locomotive designs including two Pacific types. These were an express passenger type (designated A1) with  driving wheels and a 'heavy passenger and freight' type (designated A2) with  driving wheels. He was not able to proceed with his plan due to the Second World War but did try out some of his ideas by rebuilding Nigel Gresley's P2 class 2-8-2 as A2/2 pacifics and building the last four V2 class already on order as A2/1 Pacifics. In April 1944, Thompson finally received authority to build thirty new locomotives of his A2 type during 1945, and a further thirteen during 1946.

Design
The locomotives retained Thompson's divided drive with the middle cylinder driving the first pair of driving wheels and the outside cylinders the middle pair. However, in order to have three connecting rods of the same length with three independent sets of Walschaerts valve gear, the outside cylinders were set back behind the bogie.

Building
The locomotives were due to be built at Doncaster works but were subject to various delays and so only the first, No. 500 appeared in traffic in May 1946, prior to Thompson's retirement aged sixty-five, the following month. Fourteen further examples were then under construction and appeared under Thompson's successor Arthur Peppercorn, between July 1946 and September 1947. After trials during the summer and autumn 1946 Peppercorn decided not to build the remaining locomotives authorised until he had made modifications to the design. In fact, O. S. Nock has suggested that the Doncaster staff had begun amending the design before Thompson's retirement. The class was then redesignated A2/3, and the Peppercorn design became the standard A2 class.

Performance
The class performed adequately but according to Nock, they suffered from 'the long spacing between the bogie and the leading coupled wheels, resulting in undue flexing of the frames and constant troubles from the outside pipe connections to the valve chests.' However, in the opinion of Allen the A2/3 class were 'the best 4-6-2s turned out during his [Thompson's] superintendence.'

Stock list 

With the exception of the prototype engine 60500 Edward Thompson (who was named after the designer, Edward Thompson) all of the locomotives were named after the winners of major flat races in the immediate postwar period:

Accidents and incidents

Withdrawal 

The A2/3s were withdrawn from stock between August 1962 and March 1965 and none were preserved.

Models

Apple Green Engines produce a ready-to-run model of the A2/3 in 4 mm scale. PDK and DJH both sell 4 mm scale kits of the A2/3. Crownline have also produced a 4 mm scale kit, but this is no longer available.

DJH also sell a kit of the A2/3 for O gauge (7 mm scale).

As of 2020 Hornby have announced a ready to run A2/3 for their range of models aimed for release in December 2020

References

External links 

 The Thompson A2/3 Pacifics LNER Encyclopedia

A2 3
4-6-2 locomotives
Railway locomotives introduced in 1946
Scrapped locomotives
Standard gauge steam locomotives of Great Britain
2′C1′ h3 locomotives
Passenger locomotives